Ethylene carbonate (sometimes abbreviated EC) is the organic compound with the formula (CH2O)2CO.  It is classified as the cyclic carbonate ester of ethylene glycol and carbonic acid. At room temperature (25 °C) ethylene carbonate is a transparent crystalline solid, practically odorless and colorless, and somewhat soluble in water. In the liquid state (m.p. 34-37 °C) it is a colorless odorless liquid.

Production and reactions
Ethylene carbonate is produced by the reaction between ethylene oxide and carbon dioxide.  The reaction is catalyzed by a variety of cations and complexes:
(CH2)2O  +  CO2   →   (CH2O)2CO

In the laboratory, ethylene carbonate can also be produced from the reaction of urea and ethylene glycol using zinc oxide as a catalyst at a temperature of 150 °C and a pressure of 3 kPa:
(NH2)2CO  +  HO−CH2CH2−OH   →   (CH2O)2CO + 2 NH3

Ethylene carbonate (and propylene carbonate) may be converted to dimethyl carbonate (a useful solvent and a mild methylating agent) via transesterification by methanol:
C2H4CO3 + 2 CH3OH → CH3OCO2CH3 + HOC2H4OH

The transesterfication of ethylene carbonate by methanol can be catalyzed by a high surface area (thermally exfoliated) graphitic carbon nitride (g-C3N4) materials. This method reduces the chance of metal or halide contamination, and can offer yields of up to 60% at a temperature of 393 K.

Dimethyl carbonate may itself be similarly transesterified to diphenyl carbonate, a phosgene-substitute:
 CH3OCO2CH3  +  2 PhOH → PhOCO2Ph + 2 MeOH

Applications
Ethylene carbonate is used as a polar solvent with a molecular dipole moment of 4.9 D, only 0.1 D lower than that of propylene carbonate.

It can be used as a high permittivity component of electrolytes in lithium batteries and lithium-ion batteries. Other components like diethyl carbonate, ethyl methyl carbonate, dimethyl carbonate and methyl acetate can be added to those electrolytes in order to decrease the viscosity and melting point.

A typical sodium intercalation type battery would use an electrolyte consisting of: fluoroethylene carbonate (FEC) (99%), metallic Na (99.9%), and 1.0 M sodium perchlorate (NaClO4) solutions in ethylene carbonate and diethyl carbonate (EC/DEC), 1:1 v/v% battery-grade, mixed with FEC (10% by weight).

Ethylene carbonate is also used as plasticizer, and as a precursor to vinylene carbonate, which is used in polymers and in organic synthesis.

Oxalyl chloride is produced commercially from ethylene carbonate.  Photochlorination gives the tetrachloroethylene carbonate:
C2H4O2CO  +  4 Cl2  →  C2Cl4O2CO  +  4 HCl
The tetrachloride is degraded to oxalyl chloride by amine catalysts.
C2Cl4O2CO  →  C2O2Cl2  +  COCl2

See also
 Propylene carbonate
 Vinylene carbonate
 Diethyl carbonate
 Trimethylene carbonate
 Carbonate ester
 Ethylene

External links
 WebBook page for ethylene carbonate

References

Ester solvents
Plasticizers
Carbonate esters